Elena Vsevolodovna Sanayeva (born 21 October 1942, Kuibyshev) is a Soviet and Russian theater and film actress and social activist. She is an Honored Artist of the RSFSR (1990).

Family 
 Father —  People's Artist of the USSR Vsevolod Sanayev.
 Mother —  Lidya Sanayeva (died in 1995).
 First husband —  engineer Vladimir Konuzin.
 Son —  Pavel Sanayev (born 16 August 1969), a Russian writer, actor, film director, screenwriter and translator. Granddaughter — Veronica (born in 2012).
 Second husband —  actor and film director Rolan Bykov.

Selected filmography 
 1975 —  The Adventures of Buratino  as Lisa Alisa
 1977 —  The Nose as Podtochin's daughter 
 1978 —  The Cat Who Walked by Herself as cow (voice)
 1980 —  Alibaba Aur 40 Chor as  spirit of  cave Sim-Sim
 1982 —  Private Life as Marina
 1984 —  Scarecrow as Margarita
 2007 —  Kilometer Zero as Olga Sergeyevna

References

External links 
 

1942 births
Actors from Samara, Russia
Soviet stage actresses
Soviet film actresses
Soviet television actresses
Russian stage actresses
Russian film actresses
Russian television actresses
Living people
20th-century Russian actresses
21st-century Russian actresses
Russian Academy of Theatre Arts alumni